Mpho Skeef (pronounced /mpʰo skʲɪəf/), known by her stage name of Mpho, is a South African-born British singer-songwriter based in London.

Early and personal life
Skeef was born during the apartheid regime in South Africa to Sipho Mabuse and Mary Edwards. Her first name is a SeSotho word meaning "gift". Mpho spent her first birthday imprisoned in Caledon Square, Cape Town with her mother who was an anti-apartheid campaigner. She moved to the United Kingdom at the age of four and was brought up in Stockwell, Clapham and Brixton by her mother and her stepfather, Eugene Skeef. She attended the BRIT School in Croydon.

Career
Mpho began working in the music industry in 2004, initially as a backing vocalist for artists such as Ms Dynamite, Natasha Bedingfield, Ty, Terri Walker, Skinnyman, Rodney P, and Spacek. She was a lead vocalist on the Bugz in the Attic single "Booty La La", which reached number 44 on the UK Singles Chart. She signed to the Arts Council-funded record label Documented Records and, in 2005, released her debut single, "Comin' for Ya", and the four-track EP Don't Like You.

By late 2006, Mpho had joined PIAS Recordings/Wall of Sound on the strength of Don't Like You, and was preparing an electro-influenced album titled To Spite My Face with producers including Spacek, dBridge, and Yan Murawski. She also sang on the track "This Island Earth" on Coldcut's 2006 album Sound Mirrors, and released a second solo single, "What You Waiting For?", the same year.

By 2009, sessions for the album — now titled Pop Art — had gone into a heavily pop music direction with producers such as Future Cut, Rick Nowels, Rob Davis, and Switch. As such, Mpho issued the mixtape Mpho & the Art of Pop in January 2009 with DJ Beware. To fund extensive promotion of the album Pop Art, Wall of Sound brokered Mpho a five-album deal with EMI's Parlophone subsidiary.

Mpho's first single on Parlophone, the Switch-produced "Box N Locks" (which samples Martha and the Muffins' "Echo Beach"), was released in July 2009 and peaked at number 49 on the UK Singles Chart. Pop Art was scheduled to follow in October 2009, but following minimal airplay of second single "See Me Now" (featuring rapper Wale, the album was shelved. Mpho subsequently announced via Twitter that Parlophone had dropped her due to creative differences. Also in October, Mpho featured on the charity single "I Got Soul" with artists such as Frankmusik and VV Brown under the group name Young Soul Rebels; the single reached number ten in the UK, and proceeds went to War Child UK.

In 2010, Mpho opened a vintage tea shop in Brixton with her sister. In 2012, she performed a one-off gig at London's Tate Modern gallery as part of an event celebrating the South London Black Music Archive.

Artistry
Mpho's influences include André 3000 of OutKast, Cassandra Wilson, Kate Bush, Kraftwerk, Mary J. Blige, Prince, Soul II Soul, and Stevie Wonder—artists, she says, "who are creative and don't just follow a clear and obvious formula". She frequently includes a cover of Bush's "Running Up That Hill" in her live set lists. More generally, Mpho has cited music of the 1970s and 1980s as an inspiration.

Mpho has rejected genre labels and titles ascribed to her music, saying: "I find it extremely frustrating to be tied to one genre—it winds me up no end. It frustrates me that people need to define things in order to understand them [...] The one I'm happy landing with is 'pop' because you don't know what it sounds like. You can do what you want with pop as long as it's good and people like it." She says that during her formative years, she listened to a mixture of her parents' music collections (which included Joni Mitchell, Sun Ra, and South African music) and genres popular in south London such as reggae, soul, R&B, and ragga—she describes her music as "none of those things but all of them". A profile by The Guardian introduced the singer as "part of a new breed of young black, or mixed race, London girls [...] who resolutely refuse to make the music that's expected of 'women of colour', such as R&B, hip-hop or grime".

Discography

Albums and EPs
Don't Like You (EP, 2005)
To Spite My Face (album, 2007) – shelved
 Pop Art (album, 2009) – shelved

Singles
 2004: "Booty La La" (with Bugz in the Attic) – UK No. 44
 2005: "Comin' for Ya"
 2005: "Holla" (with Baby J.)
 2006: "What You Waiting For?"
 2009: "Box N Locks" – UK No. 49
 2009: "I Got Soul" (as part of Young Soul Rebels) – UK No. 10
 2009: "See Me Now" (feat. Wale)

References

1980s births
Living people
People educated at the BRIT School
South African emigrants to the United Kingdom
South African singer-songwriters
Singers from London
21st-century Black British women singers
English women singer-songwriters
21st-century English women singers
21st-century English singers
Parlophone artists
PIAS Recordings artists